Bjorn Merten is a former American football placekicker who played college football at the University of California, Los Angeles and attended Centreville High School in Clifton, Virginia. He was a consensus All-American in 1993 as a freshman. He also earned All-Pac-10 honors in 1996.

References

External links
College stats

Living people
Year of birth missing (living people)
Players of American football from Virginia
American football placekickers
UCLA Bruins football players
All-American college football players
Sportspeople from Fairfax County, Virginia